The following is a list of the 108 municipalities (comuni) of the Province of L'Aquila, Abruzzo, Italy.

List

See also
List of municipalities of Italy

References

L'Aquila